The Weekly with Charlie Pickering is an Australian news satire series on the ABC. The series premiered on 22 April 2015, and Charlie Pickering as host with Tom Gleeson, Adam Briggs, Kitty Flanagan (2015-2018) in the cast, and Judith Lucy joined the series in 2019. The first season consisted of 20 episodes and concluded on 22 September 2015. The series was renewed for a second season on 18 September 2015, which premiered on 3 February 2016. The series was renewed for a third season with Adam Briggs joining the team and began airing from 1 February 2017. The fourth season premiered on 2 May 2018 at the later timeslot of 9:05pm to make room for the season return of Gruen at 8:30pm, and was signed on for 20 episodes. 

Flanagan announced her departure from The Weekly With Charlie Pickering during the final episode of season four, but returned for The Yearly with Charlie Pickering special in December 2018. 

In 2019, the series was renewed for a fifth season with Judith Lucy announced as a new addition to the cast as a "wellness expert".

The show was pre-recorded in front of an audience in ABC's Ripponlea studio on the same day of its airing from 2015 to 2017. In 2018, the fourth season episodes were pre-recorded in front of an audience at the ABC Southbank Centre studios. In 2020, the show was filmed without a live audience due to COVID-19 pandemic restrictions and comedian Luke McGregor joined the show as a regular contributor. Judith Lucy did not return in 2021 and Zoë Coombs Marr joined as a new cast member in season 7 with the running joke that she was fired from the show in episode one yet she kept returning to work for the show.

Series overview

Episodes

Season 1 (2015)

Season 2 (2016)

Season 3 (2017)

Season 4 (2018)

Season 5 (2019)

Season 6 (2020)

Season 7 (2021)

Season 8 (2022)

The Yearly with Charlie Pickering

References

Lists of Australian non-fiction television series episodes